Gabriel Harrison (March 25, 1818 – December 15, 1902) was an American photographer, actor, playwright, painter, and writer active in New York City. Born in Philadelphia to an engraver father, Harrison came to New York with his family at age six. He made his theatrical debut in 1838 as the title character in Shakespeare's Othello opposite Lester Wallack. Harrison began his photography career in the gallery of John Plumbe around 1844, and worked for Martin M. Lawrence from 1847 to 1851. He moved to Brooklyn in 1851, opened his own gallery in Brooklyn in 1852, and remained in photography until the early 1860s. His notable photographs include a daguerreotype of Walt Whitman that was engraved in the title page of Leaves of Grass, The Infant Savior bearing the cross (ca. 1850), and California News, a daguerreotype noted for its staged narrative rather than being a simple portrait. His written works include a dramatization of Hawthorne's The Scarlet Letter and biographies of actors John Howard Payne and Edwin Forrest. He supported free art schools in connection with the Brooklyn Academy of Design, of which he was a founder, and was also a portrait and landscape painter. He died in Brooklyn at age 84, and his children include daughters Viola and Beatrice and son George Washington Harrison.

Works
  
Plays:
The Scarlet Letter (1876)
Books:
The Life and Writings of John Howard Payne (1875)
A History of the Progress of the Drama, Music and the Fine Arts in the City of Brooklyn (1884)
Edwin Forrest: The Actor and the Man (1889)

References

External links

1818 births
1902 deaths
19th-century American male actors
American male stage actors
19th-century American photographers
Artists from Brooklyn
Male actors from New York City
Photographers from New York City
Photographers from Philadelphia